Tanika Anderson (born 8 January 1994) is an Australian actress and performer, best known as a former member of Australian children's musical group Hi-5.

She has also starred in the Australian stage productions of Frozen and Beauty and the Beast, as well as a guest role in the television series Fisk.

Early life
Anderson's mother is Chinese Singaporean and her father is Australian with a Scottish heritage. Anderson attended Model Farms High School, Baulkham Hills in New South Wales, until Year 10, when she departed to study at the Newtown High School of the Performing Arts. Anderson is also a graduate of the Brent Street Studios. Anderson began teaching at her own dance studio, 360 Dance, at the age of 17.

Career
Anderson performed for a year as a singer and dancer at Universal Studios Singapore.

In June 2014, Anderson joined the Australian children's musical group Hi-5, replacing Lauren Brant. She had already worked with the group as an understudy and puppeteer for the previous nine months. Anderson departed the group at the end of 2016. During a promotional tour to Myanmar in 2015, Anderson experienced young women living and working in poverty, which led her to found her own ethical fashion business, You & Mei. She returned to the group as a guest performer in December 2018 and November 2019.

Anderson was cast in her first musical production, Frozen, in March 2020, as Queen Iduna. The production was due to premiere in Sydney in July 2020, but was delayed due to the COVID-19 pandemic. The production debuted at the Capitol Theatre, Sydney in December 2020. 

Anderson joined the cast of Beauty and the Beast in February 2023. The production will debut at the Capitol Theatre, Sydney, in June 2023.

Personal life
Anderson married fellow former Hi-5 member Stevie Nicholson in November 2019. She gave birth to their daughter, Wild Mei Nicholson, in November 2022.

Theatre credits

Filmography

References

Living people
1994 births
Australian children's musicians